Palmeira may refer to:

Places

Cape Verde
 Palmeira, Cape Verde, a village on the island of Sal

Brazil
 Palmeira, Paraná, a municipality in the State of Paraná
 Palmeira das Missões, a municipality in the State of Rio Grande do Sul 
 Palmeira, Santa Catarina, a municipality in the State of Santa Catarina
 Palmeira d'Oeste, a municipality in the State of São Paulo

Mozambique
 Palmeira, Mozambique, a locality in the Manhiça District

Portugal
 Palmeira (Braga), a civil parish in the municipality of Braga
 Palmeira (Santo Tirso), a civil parish in the municipality of Santo Tirso

Spain
 Palmeira, Galicia, a parish in the municipality of Ribeira, Galicia

Other meanings
 Palmeira Futebol Clube da Una, a Brazilian football (soccer) club